The 2018–19 UAB Blazers women's basketball team represents the University of Alabama at Birmingham during the 2018–19 NCAA Division I women's basketball season. The Blazers, led by sixth year head coach Randy Norton, play their home games at the Bartow Arena and are members of Conference USA. They finished the season 26–7, 12–4 in C-USA play to finish in second place. They advanced to the semifinals of the C-USA women's tournament where they lost to Middle Tennessee. They received an automatic bid to the Women's National Invitation Tournament where they defeated Troy in the first round before losing to Arkansas in the second round.

Roster

Schedule

|-
!colspan=9 style=| Exhibition

|-
!colspan=9 style=| Non-conference regular season

|-
!colspan=9 style=| Conference USA regular season

|-
!colspan=9 style=| Conference USA Women's Tournament

|-
!colspan=9 style=| WNIT

Rankings
2018–19 NCAA Division I women's basketball rankings

See also
2018–19 UAB Blazers men's basketball team

References

UAB Blazers women's basketball seasons
UAB
UAB